William Jonathan Drayton Jr. (born March 16, 1959), known by his stage name Flavor Flav, is an American rapper and hype man. Known for his yells of "Yeah, boyeeeeee!" when performing, he rose to prominence as a founding member of the rap group Public Enemy alongside Chuck D; with them he has earned six Grammy Award nominations, and has been inducted into the Rock and Roll Hall of Fame.

After spending several years out of the limelight, he starred in multiple VH1 reality series, including The Surreal Life, Strange Love, and Flavor of Love.

Early life and education
Drayton was born in Roosevelt, New York, and grew up in nearby Freeport, two communities within the Town of Hempstead. Drayton is the cousin of former Penn State basketball player Shep Garner, and of Brooklyn MC Timbo King of Royal Fam. He is also a cousin of rappers Ol' Dirty Bastard, RZA, and GZA of the Wu-Tang Clan.

He taught himself piano and began playing at the age of five. He sang in the youth choir at his church and mastered the piano, drums and guitar at an early age. According to Chuck D, Drayton is proficient in fifteen instruments. By the time he dropped out of Freeport High School in the 11th grade, he had been in and out of jail for robbery and burglary.

Drayton attended culinary school in 1978. Later he attended Adelphi University on Long Island, where he met Carlton Ridenhour (who later became known as Chuck D). They first collaborated on Chuck D's hip-hop college radio show, then began rapping together. Drayton's stage name Flavor Flav was originally his graffiti tag.

Career

Music

Flavor Flav (often referred to as "Flav") came to prominence as a founding member and hype man of the rap group Public Enemy, which he co-founded in 1985 with Chuck D. A year later, the group released "Public Enemy #1", which brought them to the attention of Def Jam Records executive Rick Rubin. Rubin initially did not understand Flav's role in the act and wanted to sign Chuck D as a solo act; however, Chuck D insisted that Flav be signed with them and the two were signed to Def Jam. 
 The group's first album Yo! Bum Rush the Show was released in 1987. Flav served as the comic foil to Chuck D's serious, politically charged style.

The group gained much wider fame with their following release, 1988's It Takes a Nation of Millions to Hold Us Back, which went double platinum. By the time the political single "Fight the Power" was released in 1989, the group had become mainstream superstars. Along with Chuck D, the showman of the group and its promotional voice, Flav stood out among the members of Public Enemy as he often got the fans excited, appearing on stage and in public wearing big hats and glasses, and a large clock dangling from his neck.

 The first released track on which Flav rapped solo was "Life of a Nigerian" on Goat Ju JU, although the first hit on which he rapped solo would not come until the 1990 single "911 Is a Joke". During Public Enemy's first years of existence, Flav experienced tensions with group-mate Professor Griff, who never liked Flav's flamboyant stance in what Griff felt should be a serious, politically-challenging group. In 1999, Flavor Flav recorded with DJ Tomekk and Grandmaster Flash the single "1, 2, 3, ... Rhymes Galore". The single stayed for 17 weeks in the top ten of the German charts.

 In 2006, Flav put out his first solo album, titled Flavor Flav. It was released during the second season of the reality TV dating show Flavor of Love.

On March 1, 2020, Public Enemy released a statement saying that the group would be "moving forward without Flavor Flav," following a disagreement over the group's decision to endorse Bernie Sanders and perform at his Los Angeles rally. Flavor Flav denounced the firing, maintaining that he was Chuck D's partner in Public Enemy and could therefore not be fired from it. On April 1, 2020, Chuck D announced that the firing was a hoax. Flavor Flav stated shortly thereafter that he was not a part of the hoax and disapproved of the stunt.

Television
After a hiatus from the music scene, Flavor Flav was invited to participate on VH1 reality show The Surreal Life. During this show, he developed a relationship with actress Brigitte Nielsen. Following the conclusion of The Surreal Life, VH1 gave Flav and Nielsen a show titled Strange Love, which detailed their globetrotting adventure in love. At the end of Strange Love, Nielsen decided to return to her fiancé, Mattia Dessi.

Flavor of Love, which aired for three seasons, is a reality show where Flavor Flav looks for love. The show's success led to spin-offs titled I Love New York and I Love Money. During the third season reunion of Flavor of Love, Flav proposed to Liz, the mother of his youngest son, Karma. The Comedy Central roast of Flavor Flav aired on August 12, 2007. Guests appearing at the roast included: Snoop Dogg, Brigitte Nielsen, Jimmy Kimmel, Carrot Top, Lisa Lampanelli, Ice-T, Jeff Ross, Katt Williams, Patton Oswalt, Greg Giraldo, and Sommore.

Flav played Calvester Hill on the MyNetworkTV comedy series Under One Roof, starring alongside Kelly Perine.

Restaurant owner
In 2011, Flav partnered with Nick Cimino to open Flav's Fried Chicken in Cimino's hometown of Clinton, Iowa. The two had met through Cimino's brother Peter, who runs Mama Cimino's in Las Vegas and Castle Rock Bar and Pizzeria in Kingman, Arizona. After enjoying the rapper's homemade fried chicken, Peter Cimino began selling chicken wings using Flav's recipe. The founders hoped to start a national restaurant franchise. A mix of squabbling owners, bounced checks, and bad business decisions led to Flavor Flav's Chicken shutting down barely four months after it opened. Flavor Flav was not involved in the restaurant's day-to-day operations; Nick Cimino simply paid for Flavor Flav's license.

Flavor Flav's House of Flavor in Las Vegas opened on the rapper's birthday in March 2012. Flavor Flav teamed up with Gino Harmon and Salvatore Bitonti to start a national franchise known as Flavor Flav's Chicken & Ribs, which opened December 21, 2012 in Sterling Heights, Michigan. The business was not affiliated with the previous two ventures Flavor Flav has had in the restaurant business. Flavor Flav's Chicken & Ribs was a casual dining experience with a quick serve attitude. Flavor Flav's Chicken & Ribs closed in July 2013 after being evicted by its landlord for failure to pay rent.

Other TV and media appearances

In 2002, Flav appeared in Taking Back Sunday's music video for their song You're So Last Summer. Flav has appeared as a playable fighter in the 2004 fighting game; Def Jam: Fight for NY. In May 2005, Flav took part in the UK reality TV show The Farm on Channel 5.
Also in 2005, Flavor Flav made a guest appearance in the MTV2 surreal black comedy show Wonder Showzen as himself, in the debut episode "Birth". On June 14, 2006, Flav's participation, with WEVR-MRC, in the Lisa Tolliver Show celebration of National Safety Month, earned kudos from Surgeon General of the United States Richard Carmona.

On November 18, 2009, Flav became a downloadable character in the PlayStation Network's video game Pain. Flav stars in Deon Taylor's horror anthology Nite Tales and Dark Christmas. On May 10, 2010, Flav guest hosted the wrestling show WWE Raw. On August 14, 2011, Flav appeared as a host at the twelfth annual Gathering of the Juggalos.

On January 10, 2012, Flav appeared with his longtime fiancée Liz on ABC's Celebrity Wife Swap. His fiancée traded places with Suzette, the wife of Twisted Sister front-man Dee Snider. On February 5, 2012, Flav appeared along with Elton John in a Pepsi Co. ad during Super Bowl XLVI. On February 11, 2012, Flav appeared as an honorary member of the UNLV Rebellion during the UNLV Runnin' Rebels victory over San Diego State, 65-63. From June to September 2012, Flav co-starred and rapped in the web series Dr. Fubalous. Flav has also appeared in YooHoo & Friends as Father Time.

Personal life and legal issues 
Flavor Flav had his first three children with Karen Ross, three more with Angie Parker, a son with Elizabeth Trujillo, and another child with Kate Gammell.

In 1991, Flav pleaded guilty to assaulting his then-girlfriend Karen Ross and served 30 days in jail, lost custody of his children, and fell deeper into addiction. In 1993, Flav was charged with attempted murder and imprisoned for 90 days for shooting at his neighbor. Later that year, Flav was charged with domestic violence, and cocaine and marijuana charges. His family performed an intervention, and he checked into the Betty Ford Center for an addiction to crack cocaine. After Flav's father died of complications from diabetes in 1997, Flav decided to re-enter rehabilitation, this time at the Long Island Center for Recovery. At one point, he broke both arms in a motorcycle crash.

Flavor Flav dated Beverly Johnson, and by 2000, he lived in a small apartment in the Bronx with her and her two children from a previous marriage, while making money scalping baseball tickets. In 2002, Flav spent nine weeks in Rikers Island jail for driving with a suspended license, numerous parking tickets, and tardiness for probation appointments. Following his release from jail, Flav broke up with Johnson and moved in with his mother on Long Island.

Chuck D became concerned about his friend's well-being and, toward the end of 2003, suggested Flav move to Los Angeles. Flav moved into his friend Princess' apartment, and within months met Cris Abrego and Mark Cronin, the creators and executive producers of the reality television series The Surreal Life. The pair sought him out as soon as they heard Flav had moved to Los Angeles. Seeing that he had remained free from his previous addictions, they wanted to cast him. Initially Flav refused, feeling the show was for celebrities past their prime. He was eventually convinced to join by previous participant MC Hammer.

On May 2, 2011, Flav was arrested on four outstanding misdemeanor warrants for various driving offenses. Police said the rapper had two outstanding arrest warrants for driving without a license, one for driving without insurance, and one related to a parking citation. Flav has since been released. In June 2011, Flav said on the Australian radio show The Kyle and Jackie O Show that when his drug problem was at its worst, he would spend up to US$2,600 a day on crack cocaine.

As of October 2012, Elizabeth Trujillo, the mother of Flav's son, Karma, lived with Flav in Las Vegas and had been his fiancée for eight years.
On October 17, 2012, Flav was jailed in Las Vegas on felony charges stemming from a domestic argument with Trujillo and his threats to attack her teenage son, Gibran, with a knife.

Flav's mother, Anna Drayton, died on December 31, 2013. On January 9, 2014, Flav was pulled over on Long Island's Meadowbrook Parkway for driving  in a  zone, and was additionally charged with  possession of marijuana and unlicensed operation of a vehicle. Authorities discovered Flav had 16 suspensions on his license. He was en route to his mother's funeral.

Flav was arrested near Las Vegas on May 21, 2015. The charges included speeding and driving under the influence.

On July 21, 2019, Flav had his youngest son Jordan with Kate Gammell.

Idiosyncrasies
Flavor Flav has a penchant for speaking about himself in the third person.

When asked about the significance of the clock on his neck, Flav responded: "The reason why I wear this clock is because, you know, time is the most important element, and when we stop, time keeps going."

Discography

Solo albums
 Flavor Flav (2005)
Guest appearances
 Anthrax, "Bring The Noise" (w/ Chuck D)
 Barshem, "Where's My $5 At?"
 Chad Muska, "Flavor Man"
 De La Soul, "Come On Down"
 DJ Hurricane, "Freeze The Frame" (w/ Chuck D & Money Mark)
 DJ Tomekk, "1, 2, 3, ... Rhymes Galore" (w/ Grandmaster Flash, MC Rene & Afrob)
 George Clinton, "Paint The White House Black" (w/ Chuck D, Ice Cube, MC Breed, Kam, Yo-Yo & Dr. Dre), "Tweakin" (w/ Chuck D)
 Heavy D and The Boyz, "You Can't See What I Can See"
 Ice Cube, "I'm Only Out For One Thang"
 Living Colour, "Funny Vibe" (w/ Chuck D)
 Material, "Burnin" (w/ DXT)
 Moby, "MKLVFKWR" (w/ Chuck D)
 Nigo, "From New York To Tokyo"
 Paris, "Freedom (Remix)" (w/ Chuck D & Dead Prez)
 Prince Akeem, "Only We Can Do This"
 Will Smith featuring Biz Markie and Slick Rick. "So Fresh" (Music Video)
 Snoop Dogg, "Bad Bitch"
 Various, "Self Destruction" (Public Enemy, Heavy D, Stetsasonic, MC Lyte, KRS-One, Kool Moe Dee, and others)
 Wu-Tang Clan, "Soul Power"
 P. Diddy, music video for "P.E. 2000"
 Taking Back Sunday, music video for "You're So Last Summer"
 Eric B. & Rakim, music video for "I Ain't No Joke"
 Melanie Amaro, music video for "Respect"
 Xzibit, music video for "What U See Is What U Get"
 Micayla de Ette, "Write a Song" and music video for "Write a Song"

References

External links

  Public Enemy
 Artist profile at MTV
 

1959 births
Living people
Adelphi University alumni
African-American rappers
African-American television producers
Television producers from New York (state)
American people convicted of burglary
American people convicted of assault
American people convicted of robbery
Illeists
People from Freeport, New York
People from Roosevelt, New York

Public Enemy (band) members
Rappers from New York (state)
21st-century American rappers
Clocks